This is a list of people who have served as mayor or president of the city council of the city of Tuzla, the third largest city in Bosnia and Herzegovina. Tuzla has had 32 different mayors since the position was created in 1878, upon Austro-Hungarian occupation.

History
The first mayor of Tuzla, Mehaga Imširović, held the post from the Austrian occupation in 1878 until 1885.

The second and third mayors, Ibrahim-beg Džindo and Mujaga Hadžiefendić, served two nonconsecutive terms each from 1889 to 1903. The first power plant in the city was opened during the tenure of Hadžiefendić, which was then only sufficient for street lighting. In the years that the 19th mayor Salih Atić served (1956–63), Tuzla saw significant development and became the economic and sports center of northeastern Bosnia.

The current, 32nd mayor of the city is Zijad Lugavić, serving since 2 December 2022.

Mayors

See also
History of Tuzla

References

Mayors of places in Bosnia and Herzegovina

Lists of mayors